Mussidia nigrolineella is a species of snout moth in the genus Mussidia. It was described by Roesler and Küppers in 1981, and is known from Sumatra, Indonesia.

References

Moths described in 1981
Phycitinae